The Women's 3 metre springboard competition at the 2022 World Aquatics Championships was held on 1 and 2 July 2022.

Results
The preliminary round aws started on 1 July at 10:00. The semifinal was held on 1 July at 16:00.

Green denotes finalists

Blue denotes semifinalists

References

Women's 3 metre springboard